Jahangir Kabir Nanak (born 14 January 1954) is a Bangladesh Awami League politician and the former State Minister for Local Government, Rural Development and Co-operatives. He was twice elected member of parliament for Dhaka-13. Currently he is a  Presidium Member of Bangladesh Awami League . He was president of the Bangladesh Jubo League and general secretary of the Bangladesh Chhatra League.

Early life 
Nanak was born on 14 January 1954. He has a bachelor's degree in Art and Law.

Career 
Nanak was elected as member of parliament for Dhaka-13 in 2008 as an Awami League candidate. He was appointed State Minister for Local Government, Rural Development and Co-operatives in the Second Sheikh Hasina ministry. In February 2009, during the Bangladesh Rifles mutiny he and parliamentary Whip Mirza Azam visited the mutineers to negotiate on behalf of the government following the orders of Prime Minister Sheikh Hasina. Nanak was reportedly shot at by the mutineers. From 2009 to 2013, his wealth increased by 73 million taka along with other Awami League leaders while in power. His annual income increased from 943 thousand taka to 4.64 million taka.

Nanak was elected unopposed as member of parliament for Dhaka-13 constituency in 2014 as an Awami League candidate.

In 2018, Nanak was not given the nomination from Awami League. Instead the nomination for Dhaka-13 went to Sadek Khan. He told the media that disciplinary actions would be taken against Awami League candidates running as independents against official candidates of the party. He was the joint general secretary of the Awami League. In December 2019, Nanak was appointed presidium member of Awami League; the presidium council is the highest body of Awami League.

In December 2022, Nanak got stuck in a rally of Bangladesh Chhatra League Dhaka College unit who were demanding the formation of a committee at the college which had been suspended since 2013 following deadly fractional clashes. Nanak is in charge of Chhatra League affairs at the Awami League tried and failed to get them to stop their protests.

Personal life
Nanak has a daughter, S. Amreen Rakhi. His only son, Fahimur Rahman Sayem (22), died in a car accident in 2011 in Cox's Bazar District.

References

1954 births
Living people
People from Barisal
Awami League politicians
9th Jatiya Sangsad members
10th Jatiya Sangsad members
State Ministers of Local Government, Rural Development and Co-operatives